The fifth and final season of the American serial drama television series Friday Night Lights commenced airing in the United States on October 27, 2010. It is the third season to be aired on DirecTV's The 101 Network. The 13-episode season concluded on The 101 Network on February 9, 2011. The fifth season began airing on NBC on April 15, 2011, and concluded on July 15, 2011. The fifth season was released on DVD in region 1 on April 5, 2011.

Cast

Main cast
 Kyle Chandler as Eric Taylor
 Connie Britton as Tami Taylor
 Aimee Teegarden as Julie Taylor
 Michael B. Jordan as Vince Howard
 Matt Lauria as Luke Cafferty
 Jurnee Smollett as Jess Merriweather
 Madison Burge as Becky Sproles
 Grey Damon as Hastings Ruckle

Recurring cast
 Brad Leland as Buddy Garrity
 LaMarcus Tinker as Dallas Tinker
 Taylor Kitsch as Tim Riggins
 Scott Porter as Jason Street
Joey Truty as Buddy Garrity Jr. 
 Zach Gilford as Matt Saracen
 Emily Rios as Epyck Sanders
 Gil McKinney as Derek Bishop
 Jesse Plemons as Landry Clarke
 Derek Phillips as Billy Riggins
 Stacey Oristano as Mindy Collette
 Cress Williams as Ornette Howard
Angela Rawna as Regina Howard
 Adrianne Palicki as Tyra Collette
 Dana Wheeler-Nicholson as Angela Collette
Louanne Stephens as Lorraine Saracen
Denise Williamson as Maura Friedman

Production
The season was produced by Brian Grazer's Imagine Television company, Peter Berg's Film 44 company and Universal Media Studios and filmed in Pflugerville, Texas.

Fictional game results

 The final score was clearly 29–28 at the end of the episode "Expectations", but at the beginning of the episode "The Right Hand of the Father", the Cowboys game ball reads 22–21.
 The game was played toward the end of the episode "On the Outside Looking In", but no game footage was shown. The final score was printed on a game ball at Buddy's Bar & Grill at the beginning of the episode "The Right Hand of the Father".
 The game was never shown, but Buddy Garrity announced the score before putting the game ball up at Buddy's Bar & Grill.
 The final score was shown on the scoreboard, and game footage was shown in flashbacks. However, the reporter in "The March" claims that Arnett-Mead, not West Cambria was the only team to beat the East Dillion Lions that year.
 The final score was never mentioned.
 The final score was never mentioned, but the epilogue shows Vince and other team members with a championship ring, and the Lions were down by five points with only three seconds left.

Episodes

Series finale

Reception
TVLine's Michael Ausiello said after watching the finale that "One of the best dramas in the history of TV is over..."

Ken Tucker from Entertainment Weekly wrote "...that was one fine, emotional, intelligent, and satisfying ending... Watching the final episode, I came once again to the conclusion that this was the best portrait of a marriage I’ve ever seen on television." The A.V. Club gave the episode an "A" rating, stating "...what made Friday Night Lights such an appealing show is the way it captured the joys of life in a small, football-obsessed town. Most of those joys stemmed from the relationships the characters forged there, all of them related, directly or otherwise, to football. Some of them were quite unexpected".

TV Guide named the series finale "Always" the best TV episode of 2011. Time magazine's James Poniewozik included it in his Top 10 TV Episodes of 2011. He said, "Bracing for a great series to produce its final episode can be like watching an egg-on-a-spoon race: you tense up, hoping your player doesn't drop it at the last moment. FNL kept the egg intact, finishing up five seasons with a finale that gave closure to a vast number of Texas stories while giving poetic voice to its values of community and selflessness" and concluded "To the end, the heart of this American classic was not whether you win or lose but how you play the game". BuddyTV also listed it as the best TV episode of 2011.

Deleted scenes
A speech by Coach Taylor playing over the final montage was cut, as Jason Katims wanted the montage to be all about the small moments coming into one. 

Scott Porter asked Katims while filming the scene where Tim and Billy are building the house, to include his character Jason Street. The scene was filmed, for the experience of the scene, Katims says, but was never intended to be included in the episode.

Reception

Critical response
On Rotten Tomatoes, the season has an approval rating of 100% with an average score of 8.7 out of 10 based on 27 reviews. The website's critical consensus reads, "Friday Night Lights delivers a triumphant final season, remaining true to its characters while continuing to dispense more of the absorbing drama that made it a cult favorite throughout its run." On the review aggregator website Metacritic, the fifth season scored 82 out of 100, based on 10 reviews, indicating "Universal acclaim".

Accolades

American Cinema Editors "Eddie" Award
 Best Edited One-Hour Series for Commercial Television, Angela M. Catanzaro for "Always" (Nominated)

Directors Guild of America Award
 Outstanding Directing – Drama Series, Michael Waxman for "Always" (Nominated)

Humanitas Prize
 60 Minute Category, Jason Katims for "Always" (Won)

NAMIC Vision Award
 Best Drama Series (Nominated)

Primetime Emmy Awards
 Outstanding Drama Series (Nominated)
 Outstanding Lead Actor in a Drama Series, Kyle Chandler (Won)
 Outstanding Lead Actress in a Drama Series, Connie Britton (Nominated)
 Outstanding Writing for a Drama Series, Jason Katims for "Always" (Won)

Satellite Awards
 Best Television Series – Drama (Nominated)
 Best Actor – Television Series: Drama, Kyle Chandler (Nominated)
 Best Actress – Television Series: Drama, Connie Britton (Nominated)

Screen Actors Guild Award
 Outstanding Performance by a Male Actor in a Drama Series, Kyle Chandler (Nominated)

Television Critics Association Awards
 Program of the Year (Won)
 Outstanding Achievement in Drama (Nominated)

Possible film
In July 2011, it was revealed that executive producer Peter Berg was interested in continuing the series, as a feature film. In August 2011, Berg said at a Television Critics Association panel that the Friday Night Lights film is in development. Berg was quoted as saying "We're very serious about trying to do it", adding that the script is currently being written. Universal Pictures and Imagine Television would produce the film, with Kyle Chandler and Connie Britton set to return. In May 2013, executive producer Brian Grazer confirmed the continued development to make a film. In December 2013, it was confirmed by Berg that a film would not be moving forward.

References

External links
 Friday Night Lights – list of episodes at NBC
 

 
2010 American television seasons
2011 American television seasons